The Wreckers are a US country music duo.

The Wreckers may also refer to:

Music
 The Wreckers, a jazz group formed by Polish jazz pianist Andrzej Trzaskowski in the late 1950s 
 The Wreckers (opera), by British composer Dame Ethel Smyth, first performed in 1906
 "The Wreckers", a song on the 2012 Rush album Clockwork Angels

Literature
 The Wreckers, a children's book by Iain Lawrence

See also
Wrecker (disambiguation)